Harriet Chalmers Adams (October 22, 1875 – July 17, 1937) was an American explorer, writer and photographer. She traveled extensively in South America, Asia and the South Pacific in the early 20th century, and published accounts of her journeys in National Geographic magazine.  She lectured frequently on her travels and illustrated her talks with color slides and movies.

Early life and marriage 
Harriet Chalmers Adams was born in Stockton, California to Alexander Chalmers and Frances Wilkens. As a child, she enjoyed numerous horseback adventures with her father, including a yearlong trip from Oregon to Mexico through the Sierra Nevada Mountains when she was 14.

On October 5, 1899 she married Franklin Pierce Adams, an electrician.

Travels 

In 1900, Adams went on her first major expedition, a three-year trip around South America with her husband, during which they visited every country, and traversed the Andes on horseback. The New York Times wrote that she "reached twenty frontiers previously unknown to white women." Adams chose practical clothing for her explorations, typically wearing pants, boots, and a man's shirt. During her travels, she focused on the customs, folklore, and languages of the peoples she visited, and lived among them, sharing their sleeping customs and food.

In a 1910 trip, she retraced the trail of Christopher Columbus's early discoveries in the Americas, and crossed Haiti on horseback. In 1915, Adams was prepared to board the RMS Lusitania in New York to sail to Liverpool when she received word that her father was ill. She travelled back west to see him, but was still on the ship's manifest and so was reported as "missing" after the ship was torpedoed and sank.

Adams served as a correspondent for Harper's Magazine in Europe during World War I. She was the only female journalist permitted to visit the trenches.

When she and her husband visited eastern Bolivia during a second extended trip to South America in 1935, she wrote twenty-one articles for the National Geographic Society that featured her photographs, including "Some Wonderful Sights in the Andean Highlands" (September 1908), "Kaleidoscopic La Paz: City of the Clouds" (February 1909) and "River-Encircled Paraguay" (April 1933). She wrote on Trinidad, Surinam, Bolivia, Peru and the trans-Andean railroad between Buenos Aires and Valparaiso.

Although invited to lecture by The Explorers Club, she was not invited to join the group (which remained male-only until 1981). In 1925, Adams helped launch the Society of Woman Geographers to address the issue of "the isolation of women of the exploring species", and served as the society's president until 1933. She later also joined the Royal Geographical Society. 

In all, Adams is said to have travelled more than a hundred thousand miles, and captivated hundreds of audiences. The New York Times wrote "Harriet Chalmers Adams is America's greatest woman explorer. As a lecturer no one, man or woman, has a more magnetic hold over an audience than she."

She died in Nice, France, on July 17, 1937, at age 61. An obituary in The Washington Post called her a "confidant of savage head hunters" who never stopped wandering the remote corners of the world. She is interred at the Chapel of the Chimes in Oakland, California.

Of women as adventurers, she wrote

Further reading

References

General references
Anema, Durlynn. Harriet Chalmers Adams: Adventurer and Explorer. Aurora, Colorado: National Writers Press, 2004.

External links

Images of Rio, many taken by Harriet Chalmers Adams 

National Geographic Society– Three Photographs by Harriet Chalmers Adams
 

1875 births
1937 deaths
American explorers
Female explorers
Explorers of Asia
Members of the Society of Woman Geographers
Explorers of South America
20th-century American photographers
War correspondents of World War I
American women war correspondents
Artists from Stockton, California
National Geographic people
National Geographic photographers
20th-century American women photographers
People from Stockton, California
Women photojournalists